St Bartholomew's Church, Quorn is the Church of England parish church for Quorn (Quorndon), Leicestershire.

It is a Grade I listed, dating from 12th century-14th century with a later 1848 addition.

The churchyard contains war graves of two army personnel of World War I and three of World War II.

References 

 details of grade I listing
 details of bells

External links 
 https://www.stbartsquorn.org/

Grade I listed churches in Leicestershire
Church of England church buildings in Leicestershire